George Douglas (c. 1540-1587) was one of the Eighty-five martyrs of England and Wales. 

Born in Edinburgh, he was originally a teacher by profession. His family were from Bonjedward near Jedburgh in the Scottish Borders.

Converting to Catholicism, he travelled to France around 1556 where he was ordained a secular priest in Notre Dame, Paris, in 1574- possibly at the testimonial of Mary, Queen of Scots. Returning to the north of England, he was a priest in York, where it seems he was 'apparelled in course canvas dublit and hose,' and in the East Midlands as well. Captured and found guilty in York of 'persuading the Queen's subjects away' from Protestantism, he was executed on 9 September 1587.

He was beatified by Pope John Paul II on 22 November 1987.

See also
Patrick Hamilton (martyr)
George Wishart
List of Protestant martyrs of the Scottish Reformation
Saint John Ogilvie
Forty Martyrs of England and Wales
List of Catholic martyrs of the English Reformation
John Black (martyr)
William Gibson (martyr)
Patrick Primrose
Hugh Barclay of Ladyland,  David Graham, Laird of Fintry,  Spanish blanks plot  
Alexander Cameron (priest)

References

1540 births
1587 deaths
Scottish beatified people
Scottish Catholic martyrs
16th-century venerated Christians
Clergy from Edinburgh
Eighty-five martyrs of England and Wales
16th-century Scottish Roman Catholic priests
Converts to Roman Catholicism
Scottish people martyred elsewhere
Criminals from Edinburgh